Eduard Hambardzumyan (born February 23, 1986, in Sochi, Russian SSR) is an Armenian amateur boxer. He is a European Champion and Olympian and was awarded a Merited Master of Sports in boxing.

Biography
Eduard Hambardzumyan was born on February 23, 1986, in Sochi, Russian SSR. Hambardzumyan won a gold medal at the 2004 Junior World Amateur Boxing Championships in Jeju. He defeated Argenis Mendez in the final. In 2006, he won a silver medal at the Russian Championships. Hambardzumyan began representing Armenia in 2007. He made it to the quarterfinals at the 2007 World Amateur Boxing Championships, guaranteeing himself participation in the upcoming Olympics. Hambardzumyan lost in his first match at the 2008 Summer Olympics to eventual gold medalist Manuel Félix Díaz. Hambardzumyan won a gold medal at the 2008 European Amateur Boxing Championships in Liverpool. He defeated Gyula Káté, who was injured in the first round of the match and was removed from the competition by the doctor, in the finals. Hambardzumyan, along with Hovhannes Danielyan, became the first boxers from the independent Republic of Armenia to become European Champions.

References

External links
Sports-Reference.com
Profile on the Russian Boxing Federation
Photo of Hambardzumyan at the 2008 European Amateur Boxing Championships awards ceremony

1986 births
Living people
Sportspeople from Sochi
Armenian male boxers
Lightweight boxers
Light-welterweight boxers
Olympic boxers of Armenia
Boxers at the 2008 Summer Olympics
Russian people of Armenian descent
Russian male boxers